Edward Hugh Falkwin Bradby (8 November 1866 – 7 November 1947) was an English first-class cricketer and solicitor.

The son of Edward Bradby senior, he was born at Harrow in November 1866. He was educated at Rugby School, before going up to Oriel College, Oxford. While studying at Oxford, he made a single appearance in first-class cricket for Oxford University against the Marylebone Cricket Club at Oxford in 1886. Batting twice in the match, he was dismissed for 4 runs in the Oxford first-innings by W. G. Grace, while in their second-innings he was dismissed without scoring by the same bowler. After graduating from Oxford, he became a solicitor in 1891. Bradby died at Kensington in November 1947. His siblings included the historian Barbara Hammond, the poet and cricketer Henry Bradby, and the author Godfrey Bradby. His brother-in-law, Arthur Chitty, was also a first-class cricketer.

References

External links

1866 births
1947 deaths
People from Harrow, London
People educated at Rugby School
Alumni of Oriel College, Oxford
English cricketers
Oxford University cricketers
English solicitors